Ahmadabad-e Mostowfi (also Romanized as Aḩmadābād-e Mostowfī) is a city in Ahmadabad-e Mostowfi District of Eslamshahr County, Tehran province, Iran. At the 2006 census, its population was 2,781 in 2,781 households, when it was in Ahmadabad-e Mostowfi Rural District of the Central District. The following census in 2011 counted 11,278 people in 3,197 households. The latest census in 2016 showed a population of 14,077 people in 4,386 households, by which time it was in the newly formed Ahmadabad-e Mostowfi District as its capital. The village had been promoted to city status on 16 April 2012.

References 

Eslamshahr County

Cities in Tehran Province

Populated places in Tehran Province

Populated places in Eslamshahr County